Memorial Hall is a historic Grand Army of the Republic hall at 22 South Street in Foxborough, Massachusetts, United States.  It is a single-story granite Gothic Revival structure, octagonal in shape, with four projecting wings and a turret capped by a statue of a Union Army soldier (carved in wood by noted sculptor  by Charles H. Pizzano).

The hall was built in 1868, and for many years housed Foxborough's public library.

The building was listed on the National Register of Historic Places in 1983. The Grand Army of the Republic Hall in Aurora, Illinois is very closely based on this structure.

See also
National Register of Historic Places listings in Norfolk County, Massachusetts

References

Cultural infrastructure completed in 1868
Clubhouses on the National Register of Historic Places in Massachusetts
Buildings and structures in Foxborough, Massachusetts
Massachusetts
National Register of Historic Places in Norfolk County, Massachusetts
1968 establishments in Massachusetts
Massachusetts in the American Civil War